Joby Harte is a British television personality.

He has worked on many television shows including the BBC's Strictly Come Dancing. Joby was part of the original production team and played a role in the creation of the worldwide hit reality series Pop Idol along with series producer Ken Warwick.

As a television actor, Harte's credits include "the baker" on the ITV children's show SMTV Live. Before being a warm-up artist, he was a radio presenter for local UK radio station 97.6 Chiltern FM.

In 2009, Harte created the company Hot Rock Media, Inc. as an entertainment empire. In 2011, Stephanie Wayland became VP, Talent & Literary of the company based in Beverly Hills, California. Hot Rock Media acquired offices at the NBC Burbank Studios and partnered with talent managers Paul Cohen and Sheri Anderson Thomas of Cohen Thomas Management. The company, The Partnership LA, currently represents 22 clients including actors and singers in film and television.

Harte is the host of the Hub Network (now Discovery Family) TV show Majors & Minors, which premiered on 23 September 2011.

Harte worked with Columbia Records and Fulwell 73 on the NBC primetime One Direction special where he interviewed the band. From there he met Ben Winston who hired him to work on the then new CBS show The Late Late Show with James Corden. Harte was one of the original production team that launched the series and was awarded an Emmy for his contribution to Carpool Karaoke.

Harte signed many young stars including Amir O'Neil (NBC's Marlon), Amari O'Neil (ABC's the Wonder Years), Ricky Garcia (Universals Bigger Fatter Liar) Emery Kelly (Netflix Alexa and Katie) and Disney Channel break out Asher Angel, who he placed in the WB franchise movie Shazam. Angel went on to become Harte's biggest theatrical client and earner.

Hartes clients have been nominated for and won Teen Choice Awards, Iheart Radio Awards, RDMA's and Nickelodeon's Kids Choice Awards.

In 2018 Harte teamed up with Veteran manager Johnny Wright to manage the winning act of the ABC primetime series Boyband. The band was named In Real Life and were signed to Hollywood Records where they went on to have international success and a string of top 40 hits.

Harte represents the members of In Real Life theatrically, placing Chance Perez in the Netflix series Power Rangers Dino Fury which he filmed during the global pandemic in New Zealand.

Harte continued his relationship with Wright and they share Asher Angel in the music space, placing him with record label Hitco under the eye of musical genius LA Reid. Angels first release with the label was One Thought Away feat Wiz Kalifa, which became the number 1 video on YouTube for 3 days.

With the success of Asher Angel and In Real Life, the band Forever in Your Mind lost its steam and were dropped by Hollywood Records. It was shortly after the band disbursed that one of the members (Ricky Garcia) filed a lawsuit against Harte and several other Hollywood heavy weights. Harte has not spoken publicly on the suit but is said to be heartbroken that it was filed and disgusted by the nature of the claims.

In September 2019 he had a lawsuit filed against him by former client and Forever in Your Mind member Ricky Garcia. All members of the Law Suit have denied Garcia's claims.

Filmography
Note: Unless noted, these roles are behind-the-scenes work.
 Majors & Minors: Host
 Baggage
 William & Kate
 Bucket & Skinner's Epic Adventures
 X-Men First Class
 Million Dollar Money Drop
 1 vs. 100
 Cook or Quit
 The $25,000 Pyramid
 The Newlywed Game
 True Jackson, VP
 BrainSurge
 Dancing with the Stars
 Step It Up and Dance
 Dance on Sunset
 Strictly Come Dancing
 Just the Two of Us
 Russell Brand's Got Issues
 The Russell Brand Show
 TRL
 TOTP
 Big Brother
 Ministry of Mayhem
 SMTV Live
 CD:UK
 Pop Idol
 Diggit
 The Farm
 1 Leicester Square
 Play the Game
 Shark Infested Custard
 BRIT Awards
 It Started With Swap Shop

External links

References

British entertainers
1982 births
Living people